Zaviyeh-ye Zarjabad (also Romanized as Zāvīyeh-ye Zarjābād and Zāvīyeh-ye Zarajābād; also known as Zāvīyeh) is a village in Zarjabad Rural District, Firuz District, Kowsar County, Ardabil Province, Iran. At the 2006 census, its population was 233, in 46 families.

References 

Towns and villages in Kowsar County